Jamie Hersch (born May 25, 1987) is an American journalist for the NHL Network and the MLB Network, where she hosts the NHL Network show On the Fly and on an occasion the MLB Network version Quick Pitch.

Early life and education
Hersch was born and raised in Champlin, Minnesota, where she spent time figure skating. Her mom was a speech/language pathologist with the Anoka-Hennepin school district's early intervention program. Hersch was first interested in broadcasting by watching Michele Tafoya on Monday Night Football. Hersch started covering sports events in high school. She graduated from Champlin Park High School in 2005. She graduated from the University of Southern California magna cum laude in 2009. While at USC, Hersch covered the USC athletic teams, had a number of positions at the campus TV Station, and was third place in 2009 Hearst Broadcast Competition winning one thousand dollars.

Career
Hersch started her career in WKOW-TV in Madison, Wisconsin. Then in 2013, came back home when she hired by Fox Sports North (now Bally Sports North) to cover the Minnesota Twins and Minnesota Wild. During her time with Fox Sports North, Hersch traveled to Kuwait to cover several former NHL players who brought hockey to the American troops serving overseas. They spent several days living at Camp Buehring with the soldiers while running hockey skills clinics and playing floor hockey games on the base. In 2015, when the MLB Network and the NHL Network paired up, she joined the networks. She also spent some time covering sports for the Big Ten Network.

Personal life
Hersch is married with two kids. She's a fan of the Minnesota Twins and the Minnesota Wild.

References

External links

1987 births
Living people
American sports journalists
Women sports journalists
American women television journalists
American television talk show hosts
MLB Network personalities
University of Southern California alumni
People from Champlin, Minnesota
21st-century American women